Bryan Keith Miller II  (born May 31, 1989) is an American athlete who specializes in the 400m. He is an 11 time All-American for Texas A&M University.

Personal life and education 
Miller was born on May 31, 1989, in Houston, Texas. and attended Episcopal High School from 2003 to 2007. He started running track at the age of 11 in 2001 from the Track Houston track club. He personal best in high school were 10.70 (100m), 21.25 (200m)  47.02 (400m) and 1:55.25 (800m).  
 
Miller currently resides in Austin, Texas working in product management. He is currently involved in Real Estate Investing.

Running career

Collegiate 
He chose Texas A&M University in College Station, Texas. over other schools that could offer athletic scholarships. At Texas A&M, an NCAA Division I school, Miller earned a degree in Sports management in 2012. At Texas A&M, Recorded second fastest time on team when he set a personal best of 45.85 for fourth place at Big 12 Championships ... Finished third in 400 (46.32) at US Juniors ... Ran second leg (46.7) of United States team that won gold in 4 x 400 (3:03.86) at World Juniors in Poland.  Millers  collegiate best in the 400m (45.29)and (46.34) indoors.

Personal Records 

 200m outdoors - 21.03.  
 400 m outdoors - 45.29.

References

External links

1989 births
Living people
Athletes (track and field) at the 2011 Pan American Games
American male sprinters
Texas A&M Aggies men's track and field athletes
Pan American Games track and field athletes for the United States